Irsogladine is a phosphodiesterase inhibitor.

References

Phosphodiesterase inhibitors
Triazines
Chloroarenes